Sarah Jane Price (born 19 April 1979) is a female English former backstroke swimmer.

Swimming career
Price represented Great Britain in the Olympics and European championships, and competed for England in the Commonwealth Games.  She began her swimming career at the Potters Bar club, and turned professional aged 15.  She set her first British record in 1997 in the 50-metre backstroke.  She also swam for Barnet Copthall Swimming Club, before ending her career at Loughborough University.

In 2001, at the European Short Course Swimming Championships, Price set a world record in the 200-metre backstroke winning gold. At the 2002 Commonwealth Games in Manchester, she won gold medals in the 100-metre and 200-metre backstroke races, and bronze in the 50-metre race and the 4×100-metre medley relay.  At the 2004 Summer Olympics in Athens, she cut her leg on an underwater camera and was eliminated as a result. Price retired in March 2005.

At the ASA National British Championships she won the 50 metres backstroke title four times (1996, 2001, 2002, 2003) and the 100 metres backstroke title four times (1997, 1998, 2001, 2002).

See also
 List of Commonwealth Games medallists in swimming (women)

References

External links
 BBC Sports Academy

1979 births
Living people
Sportspeople from London
Olympic swimmers of Great Britain
Swimmers at the 2000 Summer Olympics
Swimmers at the 2004 Summer Olympics
Swimmers at the 1998 Commonwealth Games
Swimmers at the 2002 Commonwealth Games
Alumni of Loughborough University
Commonwealth Games gold medallists for England
Commonwealth Games bronze medallists for England
European Aquatics Championships medalists in swimming
English backstroke swimmers
English female swimmers
Commonwealth Games medallists in swimming
Medallists at the 1998 Commonwealth Games
Medallists at the 2002 Commonwealth Games